The 9th Arkansas Field Battery (1863–1865) was a Confederate Army artillery battery during the American Civil War. Also known as: Trigg's Arkansas Artillery Battery. This battery is distinguished from an earlier battery commanded by the same Captain John T. Trigg, which was also known as Trigg's Arkansas Battery, or Austin's Battery or the Austin Artillery and participated in the Battle of Shiloh. Trigg's earlier battery was disbanded in July 1862.

Confusion regarding naming
John T. Trigg commanded a battery in Hardee's Third Corps of the Army of Mississippi during the Battle of Shiloh. That battery was subsequently disbanded in July 1862. Captain Trigg drops from sight until his name reappears in Special Orders No. 161, District of Arkansas, dated from Arkadelphia on September 20, 1863, which ordered Captain Trigg, with his company to report to the commanding officer of Price's Division.  Exactly where and when this new company was formed is unclear from the records. A few days later, on October 11, 1863, Trigg requested and apparently was granted a furlough of four days.

Arkansas' capital city, Little Rock, had fallen to Union forces on September 10, 1862. During the operations leading up to the fall of the capital, W. E. Woodruff, formerly of the Pulaski Light Artillery, had formed a temporary battery for the defence of Little Rock. The battery was under the command of Woodruff and 1st Lieutenant Anderson Mills "of Trigg's battery, on leave". Woodruff goes on to state "Mills was first lieutenant of Trigg's battery, so assigned from Marshall's Battery. He was acting captain for the new battery from its inception until the surrender". It is assumed that the "new battery" refers to Trigg's Battery. The Compiled Service Record for R. A. Mills (Arkansas Miscellaneous) has the note "1st Lieut Comdg 9th Ark Batty. Trigg's Battery." It may be that the 9th Arkansas Field Battery was Trigg's in name only.

Service 
On September 11, 1864, Brigadier General Churchill issued Special Order Number 72 from Camp Yell which mentioned Trigg's Battery:

In General E. Kirby Smith's  September 30, 1864, report on the Organization of the Army of the Trans-Mississippi Department, Trigg's Battery is listed as belonging to the 8th Mounted Artillery Battalion, along with Etter's 6th Arkansas Field Battery and Edgar's (Texas) battery. On November 19, 1864, General Smith's issued Special Orders Number 290 from Shreveport, La., which reorganized the Artillery of the Army of the Department of the Trans-Mississippi:

Surrender 
The Army of the Trans-Mississippi was surrendered by General Kirby Smith on May 26, 1865. The date of the military convention between Confederate General Edmund Kirby Smith and Union General Edward Canby for the surrender of the troops and public property in the Trans-Mississippi Department was May 26, 1865, however, it took a while for parole commissioners to be appointed and for public property to be accounted for. As a result, a final report of field artillery which was part of the accounting process, was not completed until June 1, 1865. Unlike the other Arkansas batteries, Trigg's 9th Arkansas Field Battery is not listed in the final accounting of government property.

See also 

 List of Arkansas Civil War Confederate units
 Lists of American Civil War Regiments by State
 Confederate Units by State
 Arkansas in the American Civil War
 Arkansas Militia in the Civil War

Notes

References 
 Sikakis, Stewart, Compendium of the Confederate Armies, Florida and Arkansas, Facts on File, Inc., 1992, .
 United States. (1961). Compiled service records of Confederate soldiers who served in organizations from the State of Arkansas. Washington, D.C.: National Archives, National Archives and Records Service, General Services Administration.
 U.S. War Department, The War of the Rebellion: a Compilation of the Official Records of the Union and Confederate Armies, U.S. Government Printing Office, 1880–1901.
 Woodruff, W. E. (1903). With the light guns in '61-'65: Reminiscences of eleven Arkansas, Missouri and Texas light batteries, in the civil war. Little Rock, Ark: Central printing company.

External links 
 Edward G. Gerdes Civil War Home Page
 The Encyclopedia of Arkansas History and Culture
 The War of the Rebellion: a Compilation of the Official Records of the Union and Confederate Armies
 The Arkansas History Commission, State Archives, Civil War in Arkansas

Units and formations of the Confederate States Army from Arkansas
1865 disestablishments in Arkansas
Military units and formations disestablished in 1865
Military units and formations in Arkansas
Military in Arkansas
1863 establishments in Arkansas
Military units and formations established in 1863
Artillery units and formations of the American Civil War